Hahn Lake is a lake in Sibley County, in the U.S. state of Minnesota.

Hahn Lake was named for William Hahn, a pioneer who settled near the lake in 1879.

References

Lakes of Minnesota
Lakes of Sibley County, Minnesota